Antonopoulos is a Greek surname with the female version being Antonopoulou. The name is derived from the root name Antonius. Among others, it is the surname of:

 Anastasios Antonopoulos (1893 - ???), Greek wrestler
 Andreas Antonopoulos (born 1972), Greek British bitcoin advocate and security expert
 Antonios Antonopoulos (1805 - 1887), Greek politician
 Apostolos Antonopoulos (born 1983), Greek swimmer
 Constantinos Antonopoulos, Greek businessman
 Filonas Antonopoulos, Greek footballer (AEK Athens F.C. president)
 Ioannis Antonopoulos (1810 - 1882), Greek politician
 Seven Antonopoulos (born 1974), American rock drummer

Notes

Greek-language surnames
Patronymic surnames
Surnames